Events in the year 1903 in Brazil.

Incumbents

Federal government
President: Francisco de Paula Rodrigues Alves 
Vice President: Francisco Silviano de Almeida Brandão

Governors 
 Alagoas: Euclides Vieira Malta (till 12 June), Joaquim Paulo Vieira Malta (from 12 June)
 Amazonas: Silvério José Néri
 Bahia: Severino Vieira
 Ceará: Pedro Augusto Borges
 Goiás: José Xavier de Almeida
 Maranhão: Manuel Lopes da Cunha
 Mato Grosso: Antônio Pedro Alves de Barros, then Antônio Pais de Barros
 Minas Gerais: Francisco Salles
 Pará: Augusto Montenegro
 Paraíba: José Peregrino de Araújo
 Paraná: Francisco Xavier da Silva
 Pernambuco: Antônio Gonçalves Ferreira
 Piauí: Arlindo Francisco Nogueira
 Rio Grande do Norte: Alberto Maranhão
 Rio Grande do Sul: Antônio Augusto Borges de Medeiros
 Santa Catarina:
 São Paulo: 
 Sergipe:

Vice governors 
 Rio Grande do Norte:
 São Paulo:

Events
29 June - A meteorite fall, classification H5, is observed in Uberaba, Minas Gerais.
11 November - The Treaty of Petrópolis ends tension between Brazil and Bolivia over the then-Bolivian territory of Acre (today the Acre state).

Births
3 August - Aimée de Heeren, socialite (died 2006)
7 November - Ary Barroso, composer, pianist, songwriter, soccer commentator, and talent-show host (died 1964)
22 December - Joanídia Sodré, music educator, pianist, conductor and composer (died 1975)
 30 December - Cândido Portinari, painter (died 1962)

Deaths
22 February - Victor Meirelles, painter (born 1832)

References

See also 
1903 in Brazilian football

 
1900s in Brazil
Years of the 20th century in Brazil
Brazil
Brazil